The Warrior Is a Child is the third studio album by Christian singer-songwriter Twila Paris. Released in 1984, it would be her final album on Benson Records's Milk & Honey label. The album climbed to number eight on the Billboard Top Inspirational Albums chart. The title song was a hit at Christian radio topping the Christian AC chart for 18 weeks. Paris was nominated in three categories at the 16th GMA Dove Awards for Female Vocalist of the Year, Song of the Year for the title song and Inspirational Album of the Year. The track "We Bow Down" has become one of Paris' praise and worship standards. The title song was ranked at number 48 from CCM Magazines The 100 Greatest Songs in Christian Music. 

 Track listing 
All songs written by Twila Paris, except where noted.
"The Warrior Is a Child" - 4:05
"Forever Eyes" - 3:35
"Clearer Vision" - 4:14
"Do I Trust You" - 4:13
"Covenant Keeper" - 2:46
"The Battle Is the Lord's" - 2:54
"We Bow Down" - 2:43
"Leaning on the Everlasting Arms" (Anthony J. Showalter, Elisha Hoffman) (with guest vocals by Jamie Owens-Collins and Kelly Willard) - 4:18
"To Do Your Will" - 2:41
"Come On In" - 3:59
"Praise Him" - 3:36

 Personnel 
 Twila Paris – lead vocals, backing vocals 
 George "Smitty" Price – acoustic piano, Rhodes piano, arrangements
 Harlan Rogers – acoustic piano, Hammond B3 organ
 John Andrew Schreiner – synthesizers 
 Hadley Hockensmith – acoustic guitars, electric guitars
 Jimmy Johnson – bass guitar 
 John Patitucci – bass guitar 
 Keith Edwards – drums, percussion 
 Cactus Moser – drums 
 Victor Feldman – percussion 
 Jonathan David Brown – backing vocals, arrangements 
 Dan Collins – backing vocals 
 Jamie Owens-Collins – backing vocals 
 Starla Paris – backing vocals 
 Kelly Willard – backing vocals Production'
 Phil Brower – executive producer 
 Jonathan David Brown – producer, engineer
 Steve Ford – assistant engineer 
 Todd Van Etten – assistant engineer 
 Steve Hall – mastering at Future Disc (Hollywood, California)
 Joan Tankersley – art direction, design 
 Lori Cooper – layout 
 Craig Stewart – photography

Charts

Radio singles

References 

1984 albums
Twila Paris albums